Phyllocnistis helicodes is a moth of the family Gracillariidae, known from Bihar, India. The hostplant for the species is Polyalthia longifolia.

References

Further reading
 Pl. 50, Fig. 1.

Phyllocnistis
Endemic fauna of India
Moths of Asia